Anarkali Bazaar (Punjabi) is a major bazaar in Lahore, Punjab, Pakistan. Anarkali also serves as a neighbourhood and union council of Data Gunj Buksh Tehsil of Lahore. It is situated in the region that extends from the south of Lahori Gate of the Walled City to across the Mall Road.

The bazaar was listed in the 2020 World Monuments Watch by the World Monuments Fund to highlight the urgent need for its preservation and protection, since it is currently endangered due to neglect.

History

The Anarkali bazaar is one of the oldest surviving markets in the Indian Subcontinent, dating back at least 200 years. It derives its name from the nearby mausoleum thought to be that of a courtesan named Anārkalī, who was 'chased out of town' by order of the Mughal Emperor Akbar for having a love affair with his son, Prince Salīm, who would later become Emperor Jahāngīr.

Bazaar
Shops in Anarkali sell textiles, garments, jewellery, and many other items. The bazaar is now divided into two sections: the 'Old Anarkali Bazaar' and the 'New Anarkali Bazaar'. The Old Anarkali Bazaar is noted for its traditional food items while the New Anarakli Bazaar is known for its traditional handicraft and embroidery. Within the New Anarkali Baazaar are markets known as Bano Bazaar, Dhani Ram Road, Jan Muhammad Road, Aabkari Road, Paisa Akhbar, Urdu Bazar and Paan Gali. New Anarkali Bazar is also famous for halwa puri, nihari and siri paye.

The mausoleum of Sultan Qutb ud-Din Aibak of Mamluk Sultanate is also located in Anarkali Bazaar. In the early 1970s, the mausoleum was renovated at the orders of the then Prime Minister Zulfiqar Ali Bhutto.

See also
 S. Mohkam-ud-Din and Sons Bakers
 Naulakha Bazaar

Bibliography 

 Nevile, Pran. Lahore: A Sentimental Journey. India, Penguin Books, 2006.

References

Data Gunj Bakhsh Zone
Bazaars in Lahore
Market towns in Pakistan
Tourist attractions in Lahore
Shopping districts and streets in Pakistan